Zoe Holloway may refer to:

Zoe Holloway, character in Dominion (TV series)
Zoe Holloway, actress in Portrait of a Call Girl